Asthore Sheena Hilleary (née Mackintosh) (10 November 1928 – 13 December 2018) was a British alpine skier and the daughter of Chris Mackintosh and Lady Jean Bell (née Douglas-Hamilton). She competed in two events at the 1948 Winter Olympics.
Her siblings Charlach Mackintosh, Vora Mackintosh and Douglas Mackintosh all represented Great Britain in skiing events in the Winter Olympics.

In 1952 she married Ruaraidh Edward Hilleary.

A series of photographic portraits of Sheena as a child with her family, taken by Bassano Ltd are held in the collection of the National Portrait Gallery, London.

References

External links
 

1928 births
2018 deaths
British female alpine skiers
Olympic alpine skiers of Great Britain
Alpine skiers at the 1948 Winter Olympics
Alpine skiers at the 1952 Winter Olympics
Sportspeople from London